Melissa Marie Ricks-Macatangay (born January 9, 1990) is a Filipino actress of American descent. She was a runner-up in the reality talent search Star Circle Quest on ABS-CBN.

Background

Career
In 2004, Ricks joined the reality talent search of ABS-CBN, Star Circle Quest. She was one of the top 10 Questors or Magic Circle of 10, and after few weeks of training, made it to the final 5 or Magic Circle of 5. In the Grand Questor's Night, she was declared as the 4th runner up.

After the contest, Ricks guested in some TV shows of ABS-CBN particularly in the youth oriented drama SCQ Reload and variety show ASAP Fanatic.

Ricks received one of her biggest breaks when she portrayed Hiyas, the apple of Pedro Penduko's eyes in the Fantaserye Komiks Presents: Da Adventures of Pedro Penduko and when she starred in the primetime drama series Iisa Pa Lamang led by Claudine Barretto.

Ricks starred in Kambal sa Uma, an afternoon drama series on ABS-CBN with Shaina Magdayao, Rio Locsin, Matt Evans and Jason Abalos. She came back abruptly to Primetime on the hit series Tanging Yaman in 2010 alongside Erich Gonzales.

Ricks is currently a member of ABS CBN's Star Magic.

During the 2011-2012 season, Ricks portrayed Elisa Altamira in Nasaan Ka, Elisa?, the Philippine adaptation of the Chilean 2009 drama ¿Dónde está Elisa? (later remade in United States in 2010). She then played her biggest break in the role of Johanna Montenegro in the multi-acclaimed phenomenal primetime drama series, Walang Hanggan.

Filmography

Film

Television

Awards and nominations

References

External links
 

1990 births
Living people
Filipino child actresses
Filipino film actresses
Filipino television actresses
Filipino people of American descent
American actresses of Filipino descent
American expatriates in the Philippines
Star Circle Quest participants
Star Magic
ABS-CBN personalities
People from California